Independent Workers of North America was a union created as a result of a split within the cement division of the International Brotherhood of Boilermakers, Iron Ship Builders, Blacksmiths, Forgers and Helpers,, known as the Boilermakers Union.

In 1991, cement workers from the Independent Workers of North America joined the United Paperworkers International Union (UPIU).

In 1999, the United Paperworkers International Union (UPIU)  and Oil, Chemical, and Atomic Workers Union International Union (OCAW) merged to create the 
Paper, Allied-Industrial, Chemical and Energy Workers International Union (PACE).

References

Defunct trade unions in the United States
1991 disestablishments in the United States